San Juan del Puerto, Spain is a municipality located in the province of Huelva, Spain. In 2005 it had a population of  6,881.

References

Crazy mesta.

External links
San Juan del Puerto - Multiterritorial Information System of Andalusia

Municipalities in the Province of Huelva